Pilot Township is one of seventeen townships in Kankakee County, Illinois, USA.  As of the 2010 census, its population was 2,086 and it contained 859 housing units.  It was formed from a portion of Salina Township on March 11, 1857.

Geography

Cities, towns, villages
 Herscher

Unincorporated towns
 Dickeys at 
 Goodrich at 
 Lehigh at 
(This list is based on USGS data and may include former settlements.)

Extinct towns
 Pilot Center at 
(These towns are listed as "historical" by the USGS.)

Adjacent townships
 Salina Township (north)
 Limestone Township (northeast)
 Otto Township (east)
 Chebanse Township, Iroquois County (southeast)
 Milks Grove Township, Iroquois County (south)
 Rogers Township, Ford County (southwest)
 Norton Township (west)
 Essex Township (northwest)

Cemeteries
The township contains these seven cemeteries: Grand Prairie, Grand Prairie United, Mount Hope, Pilot Center, Saint Peter and Paul, Trinity and Zion Lutheran.

Demographics

Government
The township is governed by an elected Town Board of a Supervisor and four Trustees.  The Township also has an elected Assessor, Clerk, Highway Commissioner and Supervisor.  The Township Office is located at  366 East Kay, Herscher, IL 60941.

Political districts
 Illinois's 11th congressional district
 State House District 75
 State Senate District 38

School districts
 Herscher Community Unit School District 2

References
 
 United States Census Bureau 2007 TIGER/Line Shapefiles
 United States National Atlas

External links
 Kankankee County Official Site
 City-Data.com
 Illinois State Archives

Townships in Kankakee County, Illinois
Populated places established in 1857
Townships in Illinois
1857 establishments in Illinois